Atashkadeh is a mountain located in Paveh County, Kermanshah Province, Iran. Atashkadeh, meaning the firewall (or hatch) is a mountain range isolated from Shahu, including the Zagros mountain range, located south of the Paveh city and in the village of Khanahaha. This mountain starts from the village of sword and leads to the river Siervan. The peak of the sanctuary, as the highest peak of the southern shaho (2465 m), has views of the wide area near Kermanshah, Ravansar, Vujvanrood, and Salas Babakhani, and the Heldjah and Shahrsar areas of Kurdistan and Marivan. For this reason, at the time of the Zoroastrians, there was a place to light the fire, by which they announced their message of religion. The fire temple of Paveh (fire) lasted for about 750 to 800 years. The fire temple, from ancient times, was the place of pilgrimage and fire of Zoroastrians, and it was burned for 800 years., Iran.

References

Mountains of Kermanshah Province
Zagros Mountains
Mountains of Iran